Lejasciems is a village in Gulbene Municipality, Latvia. In 1928 Lejasciems received town rights but lost them in 1939.

External links 
 

Towns and villages in Latvia
1928 establishments in Latvia
Gulbene Municipality
Kreis Walk